The women's shot put event at the 2011 Summer Universiade was held on 20 August.

Results

References
Results

Shot
2011 in women's athletics
2011